In group theory, a dicyclic group (notation Dicn or Q4n) is a particular kind of non-abelian group of order 4n (n > 1).  It is an extension of the cyclic group of order 2 by a cyclic group of order 2n, giving the name di-cyclic. In the notation of exact sequences of groups, this extension can be expressed as:

More generally, given any finite abelian group with an order-2 element, one can define a dicyclic group.

Definition

For each integer n > 1, the dicyclic group Dicn can be defined as the subgroup of the unit quaternions generated by

More abstractly, one can define the dicyclic group Dicn as the group with the following presentation

Some things to note which follow from this definition:

if , then 

Thus, every element of Dicn can be uniquely written as akxj, where 0 ≤ k < 2n and j = 0 or 1. The multiplication rules are given by

It follows that Dicn has order 4n.

When n = 2, the dicyclic group is isomorphic to the quaternion group Q. More generally, when n is a power of 2, the dicyclic group is isomorphic to the generalized quaternion group.

Properties

For each n > 1, the dicyclic group Dicn is a non-abelian group of order 4n.  (For the degenerate case n = 1, the group Dic1 is the cyclic group C4, which is not considered dicyclic.)

Let A =  be the subgroup of Dicn generated by a. Then A is a cyclic group of order 2n, so [Dicn:A] = 2. As a subgroup of index 2 it is automatically a normal subgroup. The quotient group Dicn/A is a cyclic group of order 2.

Dicn is solvable; note that A is normal, and being abelian, is itself solvable.

Binary dihedral group

The dicyclic group is a binary polyhedral group — it is one of the classes of subgroups of the Pin group Pin−(2), which is a subgroup of the Spin group Spin(3) — and in this context is known as the binary dihedral group.

The connection with the binary cyclic group C2n, the cyclic group Cn, and the dihedral group Dihn of order 2n is illustrated in the diagram at right, and parallels the corresponding diagram for the Pin group. Coxeter writes the binary dihedral group as ⟨2,2,n⟩ and binary cyclic group with angle-brackets, ⟨n⟩.

There is a superficial resemblance between the dicyclic groups and dihedral groups; both are a sort of "mirroring" of an underlying cyclic group. But the presentation of a dihedral group would have x2 = 1, instead of x2 = an; and this yields a different structure.

The dicyclic group has a unique involution (i.e. an element of order 2), namely x2 = an. Note that this element lies in the center of Dicn. Indeed, the center consists solely of the identity element and x2. If we add the relation x2 = 1 to the presentation of Dicn one obtains a presentation of the dihedral group Dihn, so the quotient group Dicn/<x2> is isomorphic to Dihn.

There is a natural 2-to-1 homomorphism from the group of unit quaternions to the 3-dimensional rotation group described at quaternions and spatial rotations. Since the dicyclic group can be embedded inside the unit quaternions one can ask what the image of it is under this homomorphism. The answer is just the dihedral symmetry group Dihn. For this reason the dicyclic group is also known as the binary dihedral group. Note that the dicyclic group does not contain any subgroup isomorphic to Dihn.

The analogous pre-image construction, using Pin+(2) instead of Pin−(2), yields another dihedral group, Dih2n, rather than a dicyclic group.

Generalizations

Let A be an abelian group, having a specific element y in A with order 2. A group G is called a generalized dicyclic group, written as Dic(A, y), if it is generated by A and an additional element x, and in addition we have that [G:A] = 2, x2 = y, and for all a in A, x−1ax = a−1.

Since for a cyclic group of even order, there is always a unique element of order 2, we can see that dicyclic groups are just a specific type of generalized dicyclic group.

See also
binary polyhedral group
binary cyclic group, ⟨n⟩, order 2n
binary tetrahedral group, 2T = ⟨2,3,3⟩, order 24
binary octahedral group, 2O = ⟨2,3,4⟩, order 48
binary icosahedral group, 2I = ⟨2,3,5⟩, order 120

References

 .

External links
 Dicyclic groups on GroupNames

Finite groups
Quaternions